The 1941–42 Chicago Black Hawks season was the team's 16th season in the NHL, and they were coming off a 5th-place finish in the 7 team league in 1940–41, and losing in the 2nd round of the playoffs against the Detroit Red Wings after defeating the Montreal Canadiens in the opening round.

The Black Hawks would finish just under .500, as they had a 22–23–3 record, good for 47 points and 4th place in the standings.  Chicago would score 145 goals, 4th in the league, and let in 155, which was the 3rd highest.  They had a very solid 15–8–1 home record, but would struggle on the road, getting only 7 victories. On December 9, 1941, the Chicago Blackhawks-Boston Bruins game would be delayed for over a half-hour as United States President Franklin Delano Roosevelt declared that America was at war.

Bill Thoms would set a team record by finishing the year with 45 points, which was the 6th highest point total in the league, and his 30 assists also broke a Black Hawks record.  Red Hamill would score a team high 18 goals in only 34 games with Chicago, as he came to the Hawks in a mid-season trade with the Boston Bruins.  Along with his 6 goals in Boston, his 24 goals would be tied for the 2nd most in the NHL.  Earl Seibert would once again lead the defense, earning 21 points, while Joe Cooper would finish just behind him with 20 points.  John Mariucci led the Black Hawks with 61 penalty minutes.

In goal, Sam LoPresti would appear in 47 games, winning 21 of them and earning 3 shutouts.  Bill Dickie would replace LoPresti in a game due to an injury, and he would record the victory.

Chicago would qualify for post-season play for the 3rd straight season, and face a 1st round matchup against the 3rd seeded Boston Bruins in a best of 3 series.  The Hawks would drop the opening game in overtime at Chicago Stadium, then would play the next 2 games on the road at the Boston Garden.  The Hawks would surprise the Bruins in game 2, with a convincing 4–0 victory, however, Chicago could not repeat their success in game 3, as Boston would hold off the Hawks 3–2 and win the series.

Season standings

Record vs. opponents

Game log

Regular season

Playoffs

Boston Bruins 2, Chicago Black Hawks 1

Season stats

Scoring leaders

Goaltending

Playoff stats

Scoring leaders

Goaltending

References 
 SHRP Sports
 The Internet Hockey Database
 National Hockey League Guide & Record Book 2007

Chicago Blackhawks seasons
Chicago
Chicago